The Minnesota Golden Gophers women's ice hockey program represented the University of Minnesota during the 2016-17 NCAA Division I women's ice hockey season. The defending champions returned to the Frozen Four for the sixth consecutive year by upsetting Minnesota-Duluth in the opening game of the NCAA Tournament.

Offseason

Recruiting

Roster

2016–17 Golden Gophers

2016-17 Schedule

|-
!colspan=12 style="background:#AF1E2D;color:#FFC61E;"| Regular Season

|-
!colspan=12 style="background:#AF1E2D;color:#FFC61E;"| WCHA Tournament

|-
!colspan=12 style="background:#AF1E2D;color:#FFC61E;"| NCAA Tournament

News and notes

January 8, 2017: The Golden Gophers competed in the United States Hockey Hall of Fame Game against the MSU-Mankato Mavericks. The Golden Gophers prevailed by a 5-3 score.

Awards and honors

WCHA Weekly Honors
Lee Stecklein, WCHA Defensive Player of the Week (Week of January 31, 2017)

Kate Schipper, WCHA Offensive Player of the Week (Week of February 7, 2017)

Year End Awards

 Kelly Pannek, Forward, Nations leading scorer (tied with Cayley Mercer, Clarkson), 19G, 43A, 62 Points

 Kelly Pannek, Patty Kazmaier Award Top Ten Finalist

 Sarah Potomak, Patty Kazmaier Award Top Ten Finalist

 Kelly Pannek, Forward, All-WCHA First Team

 Lee Stecklein, Defense, All-WCHA First Team

 Sarah Potomak, Forward, All-WCHA Second Team

 Dani Cameranesi, Forward, All-WCHA Third Team

 Megan Wolfe, Defense, All-WCHA Third Team

All=America honors
Kelly Pannek, 2016-17 AHCA-CCM Women's University Division I First-Team All-American 
Lee Stecklein, 2016-17 AHCA-CCM Women's University Division I First-Team All-American

References

Minnesota
Minnesota Golden Gophers women's ice hockey seasons
Minnesota
Minne
Minne
NCAA women's ice hockey Frozen Four seasons